Dashti (also Romanized as Dashtī) is a city in Behdasht Rural District, Kushk-e Nar District, Parsian County, Hormozgan Province, Iran. At the 2006 census, its population was 3,947, in 848 families.

References 

Populated places in Parsian County
Cities in Hormozgan Province